The Portégé is a range of business-oriented subnotebooks and ultrabooks manufactured by Dynabook Inc. From 1993 to 2016, the Portégé was manufactured by Toshiba's computer subsidiary. The Portégé series was briefly discontinued after Toshiba left the computer market in 2016. In 2019, Sharp Corporation purchased majority interest of Toshiba inactive's computer subsidiary (later buying Toshiba's remaining shares in 2020) and resurrected the Portégé.

Overview 

The Portégé series has a long line of several models, the latest being the 13.3 inch R30 series and the similar Z30 series. It is a lightweight series of laptops targeted to business professionals. Portégé laptops occasionally featured first-in-the-world technologies. R500 was one such machine, first of its kind in terms of form factor that provided an integrated DVD drive and was less than a kilogram in weight.

Portégés are designed to be mobile, with a focus on portability, style, and performance. Throughout their history, Portégé machines have been extolled due to their focus on long battery life. Furthermore, several high-end models in the Portégé line feature a Honeycomb Rib Structure which makes the laptop stiffer and more durable. Many also come with the optional feature of a solid-state drive, which is more reliable than a traditional hard disk drive, as well as USB 3.0, which allows for faster data transfer.

Earlier models include the Portégé M780 and R700. Similar to the M750, the M780 features a flip and twist screen, which means it can be used as a notebook or a tablet. The device has a 12.1-inch LED-backlit display with a resolution of 1200 × 800 pixels, and comes with a stylus for scribbling notes, which slots into the side of the chassis when not being used. The M780 also has a 320 GB hard disk, and can be customized or upgraded to Intel Core i7 processor and 8 GB RAM.

Early 2011, Intel Core released their new Sandy Bridge processors. Following that release, Toshiba has released its newest range of Portégé notebooks. Worldwide, there may be more models, however, the Australian range is known as the R830. All have minimum i5-2410M processor, 4 GB of DDR3 RAM and Windows 7 Pro.

Models

References

Bibliography

 Toshiba Corporation. Toshiba Portégé 300CT User's Guide. Toshiba Corporation, 1997.

External links
 Toshiba Portégé

Consumer electronics brands
Subnotebooks
Portege
Ultrabooks
Business laptops